Abdulla Idrees (Arabic:عبد الله إدريس; born 16 August 1999) is a football player who plays for Al-Jazira.

Career
Abdulla Idrees started his career at Al-Jazira and is a product of the Al-Jazira's youth system. On 7 April 2018, Abdulla Idrees made his professional debut for Al Jazira against Emirates Club in the Pro League.

References

External links
 

1999 births
Living people
Emirati footballers
Al Jazira Club players
UAE Pro League players
Association football fullbacks
Place of birth missing (living people)